Six Motets may refer to:
Six Motets, Op. 82 (Kiel)
Six Motets, Songs of Farewell, a composition by Hubert Parry